Kelly Clinch (born 15 December 1983) is an Australian rules footballer who played for the Fremantle Football Club in the AFL Women's competition. Clinch was drafted by Fremantle with their 15th selection and 116th overall in the 2016 AFL Women's draft. After her debut match, she played every match for the year to finish with six matches. She was delisted at the end of the 2017 season.

References

External links 

1983 births
Living people
Fremantle Football Club (AFLW) players
Australian rules footballers from Western Australia